UDP-3-O-(3-hydroxymyristoyl)glucosamine N-acyltransferase (UDP-3-O-acyl-glucosamine N-acyltransferase, UDP-3-O-(R-3-hydroxymyristoyl)-glucosamine N-acyltransferase, acyltransferase LpxD, acyl-ACP:UDP-3-O-(3-hydroxyacyl)-GlcN N-acyltransferase, firA (gene), lpxD (gene)) is an enzyme with systematic name (3R)-3-hydroxymyristoyl-(acyl-carrier protein):UDP-3-O-((3R)-3-hydroxymyristoyl)-alpha-D-glucosamine N-acetyltransferase. This enzyme catalyses the following chemical reaction

 (3R)-3-hydroxymyristoyl-[acyl-carrier protein] + UDP-3-O-[(3R)-3-hydroxymyristoyl]-alpha-D-glucosamine  UDP-2,3-bis[O-(3R)-3-hydroxymyristoyl]-alpha-D-glucosamine + holo-[acyl-carrier protein]

The enzyme catalyses a step of lipid A biosynthesis.

References

External links 
 

EC 2.3.1